The Kenosha Kingfish are a baseball team that plays in the collegiate summer Northwoods League. Based in Kenosha, Wisconsin, the Kingfish play their home games at Simmons Field.

History
Kenosha has been the home of multiple minor league baseball teams (Kenosha Twins, Kenosha Mammoths, Kenosha Kroakers) prior to the establishment of the Kingfish franchise in 2013. Fans submitted suggestions for the team's name, and the winning suggestion of 'Kingfish' was revealed at the team's launch party on November 23, 2013.

2014 (Inaugural Season)
The Kingfish opened the 2014 season on the road, and played their first home series at the newly renovated Simmons Field on the weekend of May 31 and June 1. They finished the 2014 season with a 41–30 record in the Northwoods League South Division, narrowly missing the playoffs by half a game.

2015
The Kingfish finished 2015 with a regular season record of 48–24. After beating the La Crosse Loggers 7–2 in Game 1 of the Divisional Playoffs and the Madison Mallards 2–1 in a close Game 2, the Kingfish defeated the St. Cloud Rox, in 2 games, to win their first Northwoods League Summer Collegiate World Series.

2016
The Kingfish sat at the bottom of their division for most of the season, finishing 26–46 and 9th (out of 9) in the South Division.

2017
Kenosha started the year as one of the best teams in the Northwoods League South Division accumulating a 28–17 record. But an 8–19 finish to the year had Kenosha with a 36–36 record by the end of the season. They were eliminated from playoff contention following game #71.

Mascot
King Elvis the First, an orange fish, is the mascot of the Kingfish. Before home games, he ziplines down from the left field foul pole to deliver the ball for the first pitch.

Kingfish in the Pros

Yearly Attendance

References

External links
Kenosha Kingfish official site
Northwoods League official site

Northwoods League teams
Amateur baseball teams in Wisconsin
Sports in Kenosha, Wisconsin
Baseball teams established in 2013